Skolkovo may refer to:
Skolkovo Foundation, an organization in Russia charged with creating the Skolkovo innovation center
Skolkovo Innovation Center, an emerging high-tech business area in Skolkovo, Moscow Oblast, Russia
Skolkovo Institute of Science and Technology, a private research university in Skolkovo, Moscow Oblast, Russia
Skolkovo Moscow School of Management, a graduate business school in Skolkovo, Moscow Oblast, Russia
Skolkovo (rural locality), name of several rural localities in Russia